is a former Japanese football player.

Playing career
Nishino was born in Ikoma on March 13, 1971. After graduating from Kobe University, he joined Urawa Reds in 1993. He played many matches as center back from first season. In 1997, he became a regular player. In 1999, he could not play many matches and the club was relegated to J2 League. In 2000, he played many matches and the club was returned to J1 League in a year. He retired end of 2001 season.

Club statistics

References

External links

1971 births
Living people
Kobe University alumni
Association football people from Nara Prefecture
Japanese footballers
J1 League players
J2 League players
Urawa Red Diamonds players
Association football defenders